Mamilian may refer to:

Mamilian of Palermo, 5th-century saint
Maximilian of Tebessa, 3rd-century saint